Lytham St Annes is a seaside town in the Borough of Fylde in Lancashire, England. It is on the Fylde coast, directly south of Blackpool on the Ribble Estuary. The population at the 2011 census was 42,954. The town is almost contiguous with Blackpool but is separated from it by Blackpool Airport. The town is made up of the four areas of Lytham, Ansdell, Fairhaven and St Annes-on-the-Sea.

Lytham St Annes has four golf courses and links, the most notable being the Royal Lytham & St Annes Golf Club, which regularly hosts the Open Championship.

Lytham St Annes is a reasonably affluent area with residents' earnings among the highest in the North of England.

Towns and districts
Lytham St Annes consists of four main areas: Lytham, Saint Annes-on-the-Sea, Ansdell and Fairhaven.

Lytham 
The name Lytham comes from the Old English hlithum, plural of hlith meaning '(place at) the slopes'.

The Green, a strip of grass running between the shore and the main coastal road, is a notable Lytham landmark—the restored Windmill and Old Lifeboat House Museum are here. The Green overlooks the estuary of the River Ribble and the Welsh mountains. The centre of Lytham contains many notable buildings, such as the former Lytham public library, Lytham railway station, market hall, the Clifton Arms Hotel and Lytham Methodist Church.

Lytham is home to a number of bars and pubs, from the wine bars on Henry Street and Dicconson Terrace to real ale pubs such as The Taps and the Craft House (micropub). The Lytham Brewery is a microbrewery founded in 2007 and the owners operate a production facility on the outskirts of the town.

Until the middle of the 20th century, the Clifton family was the leading family in Lytham and two of the town's main thoroughfares are named in their honour, with the main shopping street being named Clifton Street and one of two roads to Blackpool being Clifton Drive. Their estate on the outskirts of Lytham and Ansdell originally occupied a large area. Lytham Hall, the family seat, remained in the family's ownership until 1963, after which time it was passed on to Guardian Royal Exchange Insurance, and then to Lytham Town Trust in 1997. The grounds of the Hall are open during the week and on Sunday and events are organised, such as open-air plays and car shows. Several of the ornate gates to the estate and much of the distinctive pebble-bricked boundary wall survive. The parish church for Lytham is St Cuthbert's Church, on Church Road.

Lytham is the location of the Foulnaze cockle fishery. The fishery has only opened the cockle beds on the Lancashire coast three times in twenty years, most recently in August 2013.

Lytham Library closed in September 2016 as part of Lancashire County Council budget cuts.

St Annes

St Annes-on-the-Sea (also known as St Annes-on-Sea or St Annes) was a 19th-century planned town, officially founded on 31 March 1875 when the cornerstone of the St Anne's Hotel was laid. The town was developed from 1875 after Thomas Fair, agent to the Clifton Estate, sold leases to the St Anne's on the Sea Land and Building Company. Plans for the town were laid out by the Bury firm of architects Maxwell and Tuke who later went on to construct Blackpool Tower. There was an open-air seawater swimming pool from 1916 until the mid-1980s.

St Annes is the original home of Premium Bonds and their prize-selecting computer ERNIE, which were on a site between Shepherd Road and Heyhouses Lane. Premium Bonds operated from there for more than 40 years before moving to Blackpool. The shopping area declined towards the end of the 20th century and was redeveloped in an attempt to attract more retailers and shoppers. As part of this project, a restaurant quarter was established, centred around Wood Street. The work included a £2m restoration of Ashton Gardens, a park near the town centre, in 2009.

The beach to the north of St Anne's Pier was an internationally renowned sand yachting venue for many years, but this activity has been suspended since 2002 when a visitor to the beach died after being hit by a sand yacht. St Annes Beach hosts a number of kite flying events each year. In 2006 kite enthusiasts raised concerns about the future of these activities following a decision by Fylde Borough Council in 2006 to ban the flying of kites with two or more lines anywhere in the Fylde. Following representations from kite-fliers and completion of a risk assessment, the council rescinded the ban on condition that kite fliers remain at least 50m from the sand dunes.

A memorial statue of a lifeboatman looking out to sea was placed on the promenade at St Anne's after the Mexico Disaster of 1886. The original lifeboat station was established in 1881 but closed in 1925 due to silting of the channel (a secondary channel of the Ribble that ran past the pier). A lifeboat continued to operate from Lytham, but the main channel of the river also became silted up, so the lifeboat was moved to a new all-weather RNLI base a few hundred yards south of St Annes pier which opened in 2000. St Annes-on-the-Sea Carnegie Library is just outside the town centre in an Edwardian, Carnegie-funded building.

There is some confusion, even among residents of the town, about whether the correct name is "St Annes" or "St Anne's". The apostrophe has been dropped from the name by many of the residents of the town and has long been absent in many formal uses, such as local newspaper the Lytham St Annes Express, St Annes Parish Church, and Lytham St Annes High School, although the spelling St. Anne's is still sometimes used. The area takes its name from St Annes Parish Church.

In October 2008, a bronze statue by sculptor Graham Ibbeson of comedian Les Dawson, who lived in the town, was unveiled by Dawson's widow and daughter in the ornamental gardens next to St Annes Pier. Comedian George Formby, Jr. also lived in the town, and there is a plaque outside the house where he lived from 1953 until his death in 1961.

Ansdell
Ansdell is a small village between Lytham and St Annes, on the landward side of the railway line. It has its own railway station (shared with Fairhaven), the Ansdell Institute club and a public library. It is named for Richard Ansdell (1815–1885), an artist who lived in the area and painted numerous oils depicting hunting scenes. Ansdell enjoys the distinction of being the only place in England to be named after an artist.

Ansdell hosts the largest school in Lancashire, Lytham St Annes High School, with around 1500 students, a dedicated technology and IT department, and an integrated A-Level College. Ansdell also encompasses the southern end of Royal Lytham & St Annes Golf Club. Ansdell is also the home of Fylde Rugby Club (FRC), established in May 1920, later to be closed during the war effort, and re-opened in 1946. FRC has reared many eminent players, notably Malcolm Phillips (a former President of the club) and Bill Beaumont.

Fairhaven
Fairhaven is the district between Lytham and St Annes on the coastal side of the railway. It has been suggested it is named after Thomas Fair, the land agent for the Clifton estate. It is believed by other researchers that Thomas Riley named his Master Plan for Fairhaven after the Bible passage Acts 27 verse 8 referring to Paul's journey to Rome; many of the road names are connected to Paul and his journey.

Its main claim to fame is an artificial lake, known as Fairhaven Lake. In 1923 the new borough of Lytham St Annes was formed and subsequently purchased the lake with money quietly donated by Lord Ashton. In recognition of this, after extensive landscaping designed by T H Mawson, the lake was formally re-opened in 1926 and named Ashton Marine Park. After continuing confusion with Ashton Park in St Annes, in 1974 the name reverted to Fairhaven Lake. It is an important wildfowl habitat.

Its other famous landmark is the Fairhaven United Reformed Church, which is of unusual design, being built in Byzantine style and faced with glazed white tiles, and commonly known as the White Church. Fairhaven contains the former King Edward VII and Queen Mary School, which has now merged with Arnold School of Blackpool to become AKS Lytham.

The sands and tidal mudflats of the area (the mouth of the River Ribble) are an important feeding area for wintering waders. The RSPB operate a visitor centre from Fairhaven Lake to provide information and guided walks. The lake has been flooded by the sea in the distant past but is now protected by a substantial sea defence wall.

Fairhaven occupies an area of former sand dunes previously known as Starr Hills, which extended as far as St Annes town centre along the southern side of the railway. The name Starr Hills is still used for a residential home named after the eponymous residence constructed in the 1860s for Richard Ansdell, which was transformed into a hospital during World War I, before assuming its present use. The Fairhaven Estate was first laid out in 1892. Beginning in 1895, the estate was divided into parcels of land which could be purchased or leased for residential development.

History
The area is known to have been populated during the Bronze Age, and scattered hamlets have existed there ever since, including a village called Kilgrimol or Kilgrimhow, which is believed to have been founded in around 900 AD by Vikings expelled from Dublin. The area including the Fylde was known in Anglo-Saxon and medieval times as Amounderness. Lytham is mentioned in the Domesday Book as Lidun. In 1199 Richard Fitzroger gave his Lytham estates (then known as Lethun) to the Benedictine monks of Durham. The monks established a priory (although it was really too small to be called that as it comprised three or four monks only) on the site of the present Lytham Hall. The priory existed until 1539; in 1540 the monastery at Durham was dissolved and the Crown became Lord of the Manor.

The manor of Lytham passed through several owners until in 1606 it was sold to Cuthbert Clifton for £4,300. Clifton enlarged the manor house and made it the family seat. The house was replaced in 1757 with the present Lytham Hall, designed by architect John Carr of York. At this time St Annes did not exist, but Lytham was large enough to be called a town, with its own promenade and a reputation as a resort.

Northwards along the coast from Lytham, within the Clifton estates, were mostly sand dunes. The only habitations were the tiny hamlet of Heyhouses and the rural Trawl Boat Inn (a name resurrected in recent times for a public house in Wood Street in St Annes, opened by Wetherspoons). In 1873 the Cliftons built a Chapel of Ease dedicated to St Anne in this area, to encourage better religious observance, as most inhabitants found the long journey to St Cuthbert's in Lytham too onerous. This became the parish church of St. Anne's. At the time it was built the church had no tower. On 14 October 1874 the St Anne's-on-the-Sea Land and Building Company Ltd was registered, mainly at the instigation of Elijah Hargreaves, a wealthy Lancashire mill owner from Rawtenstall whose intention was to develop the area as a resort. The land of St Annes was leased from the Clifton estate for 999 years, although the lease still gave the Cliftons the right to kill game on the land for this period. Building rapidly commenced with the St Anne's Hotel (built in 1875, since demolished), the Hydro Terrace, which later became St Annes Square, and the railway station being among the first buildings. A separate company was formed to finance the construction of the pier, which was opened on 15 June 1885. At that time the main channel of the River Ribble ran by the end of the pier, and boats would bring people in from Lytham and Southport. The Ribble Navigation Act of 1883, which came into force in 1889, was intended to stabilise the often silted River Ribble to allow a steady trade into Preston docks. However, this work moved the main channel much further out and left St Annes Pier on flat sandbanks, where no ships could dock. In June 1910 the Floral Hall was opened at the end of the pier. It was a popular attraction and stars including Gracie Fields, Leslie Henson and Claude Hulbert performed there. Lytham and St Annes were consolidated in 1922. In 1974 a major fire seriously damaged the hall. It was restored to some extent, it ended up being used as a skatepark (skateboards) before another fire in July 1982 destroyed it. About half the pier was then demolished to make the beach safe to use.

The Lytham St Annes Civic Society operates a local blue plaque scheme. These commemorate historic buildings and residents, including Sir John Alcock and George Formby.

The 2012 Olympic torch relay passed through St Annes, Fairhaven and then Lytham before continuing onto nearby Warton and Freckleton.

Governance

St Anne's-on-the-Sea Urban District Council, who was based at St Anne's Public Offices in Clifton Drive, merged with Lytham Urban District Council to form Lythan St Annes Municipal Borough in 1922. Since the re-organisation of local government in 1972, the town has been administered by Fylde District Council which is based at Lytham St Annes Town Hall on the South Promenade.

Transport

Disability access
Lytham town centre has limited disabled parking. There are other car parks outside the immediate town centre however these may be too far away for those with restricted mobility.

Railway

Lytham station, St Annes-on-the-Sea station and Ansdell & Fairhaven station all lie on the single-track Blackpool South to Preston branch of the Blackpool Branch Lines. Prior to the closure of Blackpool Central in 1964 the Coast Road, as it was known, was the mainline into Blackpool, although the Lytham St. Annes stations were bypassed by the direct line from Kirkham to Blackpool South. It has been reported that Central station in Blackpool could handle with ease one million people, in and out, in one day. Today the line is truncated at South station and the branch is operated euphemistically as "one engine in steam" but in fact is just a long siding from Kirkham. Trains run between Colne railway station and Blackpool South railway station on this line through Lytham St. Anne's.

Previously there were stations in Station Road, Lytham (1846–1874) and at  near the Old Links Golf Course, St Annes (1913–1949).

Local issues

Lowther Pavilion Lytham
In 2008 local residents became aware that Fylde Borough Council was struggling financially, and in particular was becoming unable to subsidise local amenities. The closure of St. Annes swimming pool demonstrated how serious the situation was. It was felt that a group needed to take immediate action if they wished to reduce the subsidy from the council and ensure that Lowther Pavilion, the only purpose-built theatre in the area, remained open. In November 2008 Friends of Lowther Pavilion was formed, with the stated purposes of reducing the subsidy required from the council; securing the future of Lowther Pavilion, raising money for improvements, and ultimately generate profits; involving the local community in the running of the theatre and making it part of the town; and becoming the basis of a networking forum for the participating groups.

Closure of public facilities

In 2008 Fylde Borough Council announced that the borough's two public swimming pools, in Kirkham and St Annes, would be closed. Public campaigns were started to oppose both closures, and they reopened in 2010 under management by Fylde Coast YMCA, with financial support from the council.

Property developments
 the most controversial political issue in Lytham St Annes concerned property development. No more greenfield sites were available and developers were seeking to replace existing buildings or to build on open spaces such as Ashton Gardens in St Annes. Many historic buildings had been demolished and replaced with larger modern constructions of standard design as can be found in many other places. For example, the art deco former headquarters of the Football League was demolished and replaced with a block of flats.

In 2005 a property development company submitted a proposal for a 2,800 apartment development called Lytham Quays to be built on industrial brownfield sites in the east of Lytham. The developer, Kensington Developments, claimed in a 2008 article in the Daily Telegraph that "In truth, the majority of people were for it".

Wildlife

The Ribble Estuary and sands of St Annes and Lytham are an Important Bird Area, mainly as a feeding ground for waders during winter and spring. There are flocks of thousands of red knot, dunlin, sanderling, bar-tailed godwit and other waders; over 100,000 birds winter there. Flocks of pink-footed geese are commonly seen in winter as they fly over St Annes between their feeding grounds around Southport and Over Wyre. Many pintail and other ducks feed and rest in the estuary.

There are 80 hectares of sand dune habitat on the coast of Lytham St Annes which is home to a wide variety of rare and interesting plants and wildlife communities. The Lytham St Annes Nature Reserve has around 250 different plant species include internationally rare plants not found outside the UK. Common lizards are found across the dune system and it is an important habitat for various breeding birds including European stonechat, skylark, linnet and reed bunting. The grayling butterfly, which is a coastal specialist, is also found on the dunes.

Witchwood is a narrow strip of woodland that runs alongside the railway line, from Blackpool Road to Ballam Road. It was part of the original Lytham Hall parkland. The Lytham St. Annes Civic Society created the woodland walk by joining this area with land leased from British Rail, setting up a limited company to own and manage the wood. Society members cleared the undergrowth, removed rubbish and introduced a path running the length of the wood. The land is protected by a tree preservation order and part of it is a Site of Special Scientific Interest. Acting on advice from the Forestry Commission, invasive sycamore and elm are being replaced by indigenous English species such as oak, beech, ash, horse chestnut, birch and rowan. The walk, which was officially opened in 1974 by Prince Philip, Duke of Edinburgh, is a haven for wildlife and an important habitat for insects and birds.

Culture

Art and architecture
The following organisations are currently active:
 Lytham St Annes Art Society (founded 1912)
 Lytham St Annes Civic Society (founded c. 1955)
 Lytham Heritage Group
 Friends of the Lytham St Annes Art Collection
 Friends of Lytham Hall
 Fylde Arts Association
 Fylde Decorative and Fine Arts Society (Fylde DFAS)

A series of public artworks were commissioned as improvement works to The Square for Saint-Annes-on-the-Sea including a mosaic by artist Gary Drostle in 2005.

Music and entertainment
Notable musicians, actors and, entertainers who were born or live(d) in Lytham St Annes include entertainer George Formby, comedians Les Dawson, Bobby Ball and Roy Walker, comedian and broadcaster Jenny Eclair, actors Stephen Tompkinson, Jonas Armstrong, Ian Anderson, Dean Lennox Kelly and Craig Kelly, composer Peter Dickinson, guitarist Mario Parga, drummer with Alien Sex Fiend and UFX/Uncle Fester Ratfink (Andrew Wilson),  variety hall entertainer Betty Jumel, singer-songwriter Marli Harwood and Gigwise.com founder Andy Day. In 1999 Susan Swindells (now Susan Wood) created the idea for the Lytham Proms Festival for the local community to raise funds for charity and boost Fylde Coast tourism. It came to fruition with funding from her employer, BAE Systems.

Festivals

Beer Festival
Lytham Beer Festival has been held annually in September since 2007, although this was moved to October in 2012. It is organised by the Blackpool, Fylde and Wyre branch of CAMRA and offers a choice of around 90 real ales as well as a selection of ciders and foreign bottled beers.

Lytham Festival

Lytham Green sees an annual five-day musical festival branded as the Lytham Festival and operated by Cuffe & Taylor, part of Live Nation UK. Live performances on the promenade first began under the name "Lytham Proms" in 1999. In 2009, Daniel Cuffe and Peter Taylor took over operation of festivals on the green with a one-night concert by English soprano singer Lesley Garrett. The festival has since seen a variety of leading bands and musicians including The Human League, Madness, Nile Rodgers & Chic, The Human League, Kylie Minogue, Rod Stewart, Diana Ross, Duran Duran and Tears for Fears.

Sport

Golf
The Royal Lytham & St Annes Golf Club was founded in March 1886 and moved to its present site in 1926. Many world tournaments have been, and are, played there, including the Ryder Cup, the Open Championship and the Dunlop Masters.

Lytham Green Drive Golf Club was founded in 1913 and has hosted qualifying matches for Open Championship. The clubhouse is on Ballam Road.

There are two other golf clubs in the area, which have all hosted qualifying for The Open Championship. They are Fairhaven Golf Club and perhaps the most well known, St Annes Old Links Golf Club, which has also hosted many other top events in the golfing calendar. The Old Links course runs northwards from Highbury Road on the landward side of the railway line.

Rugby
Fylde Rugby Club, who compete in English National League one, play at the Woodlands Memorial Ground, which is shared with Blackpool Rugby League Club, who compete in National League Two. Amongst their notable former players are two British and Irish Lions, Brian Ashton and Bill Beaumont.

Football
The headquarters of the English Football League were in the former Sandown Hotel in Clifton Drive in St Annes between 1959 and 2017.

Cricket and hockey
St Annes Cricket Club are based at Vernon Road, St Annes. England and Lancashire cricketer Andrew Flintoff played for St Annes, starting as a 12-year-old in 1989.

Lytham Cricket and Sports Club is based in Church Road, Lytham. It is the home of Lytham St Annes Hockey Club.

Health care
Primary care is the responsibility of NHS North Lancashire Primary Care Trust.

There have been a number of recent reorganisations and building for general practice in the area.

General practice in Lytham is based at a health centre opened in 2009 called the Lytham Primary Care Centre. This building is on the site of the original Lytham Hospital. Two practices are housed in this building: Holland House Surgery and Fernbank Surgery.

Secondary care is mainly provided by the Blackpool, Fylde and Wyre Hospitals NHS Foundation Trust, whose nearest hospital is Blackpool Victoria Hospital.

Religion

Lytham
 Lytham Methodist Church, Park Street; opened in September 1868
 St Cuthbert's (Church of England), Church Road; built in 1834.
 St John the Divine Church (Church of England), East Beach; built 1848–49 by Edwin Hugh Shellard.
 St Peter's Roman Catholic Church, Clifton Street; built 1838, the tower was added in 1878.
 Lytham Christian Centre, Preston Road.
 Lytham United Reformed Church, Bannister Street; founded 1863.

St Annes
 Church Road Methodist Church, Church Road.
 St Anne's Church, Church of England parish church, Oxford Road –  built in 1873 by Paley and Austin. The tower was added in 1887.
 St Annes Baptist Church, St.Andrews Road South – opened on Christmas Day 1886.
 St Annes on Sea United Reformed Church, Clifton Drive – built by W.J. Porritt from 1880 onwards.
 St Annes Hebrew Congregation, Orchard Road.
 Our Lady Star of the Sea Church, Roman Catholic church, St Annes Road East, built in 1890 by Pugin & Pugin.
 St Thomas' Church, St Thomas Road – built in 1899 by Austin and Paley.
 Fylde Christian Service Church, St.Andrews Road South – based in the former St Annes Baptist chapel.
 St Margaret of Antioch, St.Leonards Road West – founded in 1925.
 St Alban RC Church, Kilnhouse Lane – founded in 1964.
St. Gregory's Eastern Orthodox Chapel, Orchard Road – established in 2017.

Ansdell and Fairhaven

 The Well Church, Ansdell Road North; founded 1908.
 Ansdell Unitarian & Free Christian Church, Channing Road; opened 1930, new hall added 1968.
 St Joseph's RC Church, Woodlands Road; opened 20 September 1914; built 1909 by Pugin & Pugin.
 Fairhaven United Reformed Church, Clifton Drive South; opened 17 October 1912; built by Briggs, Wolstenholme & Thornley; known locally as the "White Church".
 St Paul's CofE Church, Clifton Drive; built 1902 by Medland Taylor.
 Fairhaven Methodist Church, Clifton Drive; founded 1909.

Twin towns/Sister cities
Lytham St Annes is twinned with:
  Werne, Germany
  Caudry, France

See also
 Listed buildings in Lytham
 Listed buildings in Saint Anne's on the Sea
 John Talbot Clifton (1819–1882) of Lytham Hall – MP for North Lancashire
 John Talbot Clifton (1868–1928) of Lytham Hall – traveller
 Violet Clifton (1883–1961) of Lytham Hall – traveller and writer.
 Larry L'Estrange (1934–2007), born in Lytham – Irish rugby player and British soldier.

Notes

References
 Harrison, Gabriel (1971) Rage of Sand: the story of the men who built their own seaside town, London : Benn, 
 Pevsner, Nikolaus (1969) The Buildings of England – North Lancashire, Penguin, .

External links

 http://www.lythamstannes.news Lytham St Anne's News
 https://www.visitlytham.info Local information
 https://www.visitStAnnes.info Local information

 
Seaside resorts in Lancashire
Towns in Lancashire
Geography of the Borough of Fylde
Beaches of Lancashire
1875 establishments in England